The Tilt Hills Formation is a formation cropping out in Newfoundland.

References

Neoproterozoic Newfoundland and Labrador